Ecclesiam a Jesu Christo was a Papal bull promulgated by Pius VII in 1821.

It stated that Freemasons must be excommunicated for their oath bound secrecy of the society and conspiracies against church and state.

It also linked Freemasonry with the Carbonari, an anti-clerical revolutionary group active in Italy.  It said that the Carbonari affected a love of the Catholic religion.  However the true goals of the Carbonari was said to be:

 Religious indifference
 Disestablishment of the church and total religious freedom
 The profanation of Jesus Christ through their ceremonies
 To scorn, and perhaps replace the sacraments of the church
 To plot against Papal primacy

All members of the Carbonari were excommunicated, along with those who kept Carbonari secrets
 and those promoting Carbonari literature.

See also  
 Papal Documents relating to Freemasonry
 Anti-Masonry
 Christianity and Freemasonry
 Catholicism and Freemasonry
 Clarification concerning status of Catholics becoming Freemasons

References

Catholicism and Freemasonry
History of Catholicism in Italy
Carbonari
1821 in Europe